= Auðn =

Icelandic metal band

Auðn is an Icelandic black metal band. They have released three albums, among which two came out through Season of Mist.

== Select discography ==
- Auðn (2014)
- Farvegir fyrndar (2017)
- Vökudraumsins fangi (2020)
